Llangynyw (also Llangyniew) is a hamlet and community in Montgomeryshire, Powys, mid Wales. It is located on a hill inside a bend in the River Banwy, approximately two miles north-east of Llanfair Caereinion. The community includes the hamlet of Pontrobert.

The focus of the hamlet is the Parish Church of St. Cynyw, which dates from between 1450 and 1500
and is a Grade II* listed building.

The parish of Llangynyw had a population of 551 when the 1801 census was taken, 430 in 1901, and 295 in 1971, increasing back to 582 at the 2011 census.

Pentre Camp, an Iron Age hillfort, is near the hamlet.

References

External links
Llangyniew Community Council website
LLANGYNIEW, National Gazetteer 1868 & Lewis 1833 transcriptions, Genuki
Photographs of Llangynyw and the surrounding area, Geograph

Villages in Powys